is a passenger railway station in located in the city of Kumano, Mie Prefecture, Japan, operated by Central Japan Railway Company (JR Tōkai).

Lines
Ōdomari Station is served by the Kisei Main Line, and is located 155.2 rail kilometers from the terminus of the line at Kameyama Station.

Station layout
The station consists of a single side platform serving bi-directional traffic. The small wooden station building dates from the original construction of the line.The station is unattended.

Platforms

Adjacent stations 

|-
!colspan=5|Central Japan Railway Company (JR Central)

History
Ōdomari Station opened on April 1, 1956 as a station on the Japan National Railways (JNR) Kisei-Nishi Line. The line was renamed the Kisei Main Line on July 15, 1959.  The station has been unattended since November 1, 1986. The station was absorbed into the JR Central network upon the privatization of the JNR on April 1, 1987.

Passenger statistics
In fiscal 2019, the station was used by an average of 4 passengers daily (boarding passengers only).

Surrounding area
Odomari Beach
Japan National Route 311

See also
List of railway stations in Japan

References

External links

 JR Central timetable 

Railway stations in Japan opened in 1956
Railway stations in Mie Prefecture
Kumano, Mie